Lyonsifusus carvalhoriosi is a species of sea snail, a marine gastropod mollusk in the family Fasciolariidae, the spindle snails, the tulip snails and their allies.

Description

Distribution

References

 Macsotay O. & Campos R. (2001). Moluscos representativos de la plataforma de Margarita, Venezuela. Published by the authors, Valencia, Venezuela, iii + 280 pp., 32 pl.
  Vermeij G.J. & Snyder M.A. (2018). Proposed genus-level classification of large species of Fusininae (Gastropoda, Fasciolariidae). Basteria. 82(4-6): 57–82

External links
 Lyons W.G. & Snyder M.A. (2019). Fasciolariidae (Gastropoda: Neogastropoda) of French Guiana and nearby regions, with descriptions of two new species and comments on marine zoogeography of northeastern South America. Zootaxa. 4585(2): 239–268

carvalhoriosi
Gastropods described in 2001